Dr.B.R.Ambedkar Satabarshiki Mahavidyalaya,  established in 2005, is the general degree college in Bagdah. It offers undergraduate courses in arts.  It is affiliated to West Bengal State University.

UG COURSE 
B.A.

Bengali ( Honours and General )

English ( Honours and General )

Sanskrit ( Honours and General )

History ( Honours and General )

Philosophy ( Honours and General )

Political Science ( Honours and General )

Education ( General )

Physical Education (General)

Accreditation
The college is Affiliated to West Bengal State University

See also
Education in India
List of colleges in West Bengal
Education in West Bengal

References

External links
Official website

Universities and colleges in North 24 Parganas district
Colleges affiliated to West Bengal State University
Educational institutions established in 2005
2005 establishments in West Bengal